The 1996 IIHF InLine Hockey World Championship was the first IIHF InLine Hockey World Championship, the premier annual international inline hockey tournament. It took place in Minneapolis and Saint Paul, Minnesota, United States, with the gold-medal game played on August 10, 1996.

Teams
The eleven-team tournament was split into three groups.

Group A
Czech Republic
Germany
Italy

Group B
Australia
Austria
Canada
Finland

Group C
Japan
Russia
Switzerland
United States

Tournament

Preliminary round

Playoff round

Quarterfinals

Semifinals

Gold medal game

Bronze medal game

Consolation round

5th place game

7th place game

Relegation

References

IIHF InLine Hockey World Championship
1996 in inline hockey
1996 in American sports
Inline hockey in the United States
International sports competitions hosted by the United States